Hemet Valley Mall is a small indoor shopping mall in Hemet, California. It is located on West Florida Avenue (California State Route 74) between North Kirby Street and North Gilmore Street. It is anchored by J.C. Penney and Hobby Lobby, with one vacant anchor last occupied by Sears.

Sears was then annexed to the mall in 1998 (relocated from standalone store.) Gottschalks closed in 2009 due to bankruptcy, which was first replaced by Forever 21, and later Hobby Lobby. Sears closed in 2020 as a plan of closing 40 stores nationwide.

References

Shopping malls in Riverside County, California